The Belarusian Social Sporting Party (BSSP;) is a political party in Belarus that supports the government of President Alexander Lukashenko. It was founded on 6 November 1994 and is currently led by Vladimir Alexandrovich.

History

On November 6, 1994, the Constituent Assembly of the party was held, which was registered by the Ministry of Justice of the Republic of Belarus on December 9, 1994. (registration certificate No. 003), re-registered on September 13, 1999 (registration certificate No. 012).

In the parliamentary elections, the party did not nominate candidates on party lists, but only by collecting signatures.

In the parliamentary elections to the Supreme Soviet of the 13th convocation, the party received one deputy mandate. In the parliamentary elections to the House of Representatives of the National Assembly of the Republic of Belarus of the II convocation, only the party chairman V.A.Aleksandrovich won the election from the BSSP, who was elected in the first round on October 15, 2000 from the Mendeleevsky electoral district of Minsk.

In 2015, the deputy chairman of the party, Elena Klyuikova, confirmed that the party deliberately does not nominate candidates for the parliamentary elections, because "work in parliament involves giving up the main activity".

Declared goals

Assistance in strengthening an economically developed, socially oriented, stable state through the improvement of social norms, the unification of the progressive forces of Belarus for the implementation of social programs that favor the growth of the spiritual, cultural and economic potential of the Belarusian people; attracting public attention to the problems of educating the younger generation, promoting the ideas of citizenship, patriotism and a healthy lifestyle, attracting citizens to participate in local self-government, to solving social problems facing society.

Election results

Presidential elections

Legislative elections

References

1994 establishments in Belarus
Democratic socialist parties in Europe
Political parties established in 1996
Political parties in Belarus
Social democratic parties in Belarus